"I Dunno" is a song by Tion Wayne featuring Dutchavelli and Stormzy. It was released as a single on 29 May 2020 and peaked at number 7 on the UK Singles Chart.

Production
The song "I Dunno" brought together 3 artists who had been making a big impact in British music. Tion Wayne had broken through with his Russ Millions collaboration "Keisha & Becky" in 2019, reaching the top 10 and topping the Official Trending Chart. Dutchavelli made his breakthrough this year, also going on to score a further chart hit alongside M Huncho on the track "Burning". Stormzy had fully established himself as a music star and released his second album, Heavy Is the Head, at the end of 2019 and a chart topping single "Own It" with Ed Sheeran and Burna Boy. 
The track was produced by AoD and production group The Elements.

Chart performance
"I Dunno" was the highest new entry on its first week of release, entering the UK Singles Chart at number 7 on the chart week ending 11 June 2020. The single was behind songs including chart topper "Rockstar" by DaBaby featuring Roddy Ricch, "Rain on Me" by Lady Gaga and Ariana Grande and "Breaking Me" by Topic featuring A7S. The song spent three weeks in the top 10 in total, and a further six weeks in the top 40.

Charts

Weekly charts

Year-end charts

Certifications

References

2020 singles
2020 songs
Tion Wayne songs
Dutchavelli songs
Stormzy songs
Songs written by Dutchavelli
Songs written by Stormzy
Songs written by Tion Wayne